Tarapoa Airport  is an airport serving Tarapoa, a town in the Sucumbíos Province of Ecuador.

The runway length does not include  overruns at each end of the runway.

See also

Transport in Ecuador
List of airports in Ecuador

References

External links 
OpenStreetMap - Tarapoa
OurAirports - Tarapoa
SkyVector - Tarapoa

Airports in Ecuador
Buildings and structures in Sucumbíos Province